The Aidar is a river in Luhansk Oblast, Ukraine and Belgorod Oblast, Russia. The slopes of the valley are partitioned with ravines and gorges. In the spring, snow melt accounts for approximately 70% of the flow. The average flow module is 1.7 litres • sec / km². The river freezes in December.

References
 М. Т. Янко. Топонімічний словник-довідник української РСР, К., «Радянська школа», 1973, стор. 13

Rivers of Belgorod Oblast
Rivers of Luhansk Oblast